This is a list of PT boat bases used by the US Navy during World War II.

United States
Melville, Rhode Island - PT Training Center 
New York, New York - Commissioning Detail
New Orleans, Louisiana - Commissioning Detail 
Miami, Florida - Operational Shakedown
New Orleans, Louisiana - Ferrying Command
Seattle, Washington - Ferrying Command
ST Augustine, FL - Base of some sort where Conch House is now.

Rear Pacific Area
Pearl Harbor PT Boat Base, Hawaii - Main Naval base 
Tutuila, Samoa - Base 7 
Palmyra Island - Advanced Base 
Funafuti, Ellice Islands - Advanced base 
Naval Base Noumea, Nouméa, New Caledonia - Staging base
Taboga, Panama - Training Base

Philippines
Cavite, Luzon - Main Base 
Liloan, Panaon Island - Advanced Base 
San Pedro bay, Leyte - Advanced Base 5 
Mangarin Bay, Mindoro - Advance Base 
Ormoc, Leyte - Advanced Base 
Lingayen Gulf - Advanced Base 6 
Bobon Point, Samar - Base 17 
Subic Bay - Advanced Base 
Palawan - Advanced Base 
Zamboanga, Mindanao - Advanced Base 
Basilan - Base 16 
Iloilo City, Panay - Advanced Base 
Malamaui Island - Advanced Base 
Polloc Harbor - Advanced Base 
Sarangani Bay - Advanced Base 
Malalag Bay - Advanced Base 
Santiago Cove - Fueling Stop

Solomon Islands
Espiritu Santo Naval Base, New Hebrides - Bases 1,2,3,15 
Tulagi - Bases 1,2,8 
Rendova - Base 11 
Lever Harbor, New Georgia - Advanced Base 
Vella Lavella - Advanced Base 
Treasury Island - Base 9 
Cape Torokina, Bougainville - Base 9 
Green Island - Base 7 
Homestead Lagoon, Emirau - Base 16

Aleutian Islands
Dutch Harbor - Base 5 
Finger Bay, Adak - Base 5 
Amchitka - Advanced Base 5 
Casco Cove, Attu - Base 13

Australia, Papua New Guinea & Dutch New Guinea
Cairns, Australia - Base 4 
Kana Kopa, Milne Bay - Base 4, 6 
Ladava, Milne Bay - Base 4 
Tufi - Advanced Base 
Morobe River - Advanced Base 
Thursday Island - Base 10 
Darwin, Australia - Base 10 
Naval Base Woodlark Island, Woodlark Island - Advanced Base 
Fergusson Island - Advanced Base 
Buna Roads - Advanced Base 
Kiriwina Island - Advanced Base 
Dreger Harbor - Advanced Base 
Saidor - Advanced Base 
Seeadler Harbor - Advanced Base 
Rein Bay, New Britain - Advanced Base 
Talasea, New Britain - Advanced Base 
Aitape - Advanced base 
Hollandia - Advanced Base 
Mios Woendi - Base 21 
Wakde - Advanced Base 
Amsterdam Island - Advanced base 3 
LST-201 - Base 14 
Morotai - Advanced Base 4

Borneo
Tarakan - Advanced Base 
Tawai Tawi - Advanced Base 
Brunel Bay - Advanced Base 
Balikpapan - Advanced Base

Japan
Teguchi Harbor - Base 24, 25

Mediterranean
Bone, Algeria - Advanced Base 
Bizerte, Tunisia - Base 12 
Palermo, Sicily - Advanced Base 
Capri, Italy - Advanced Base 
Maddalena, Sardinia - Advanced Base 
Bastia, Corsica - Advanced Base 
Calvi, Corsica - Advanced Base 
St. Maxime, France - Advanced Base 
Gulf Juan, France - Advanced Base 
Leghorn, Italy - Advanced Base

Atlantic
Dartmouth, England - Advanced Base 
Portland, England - Main Base 
Cherbourg, France - Advanced Base 
Roseneath, Scotland - Transfer Point

References
PT boat bases 

bases
United States Navy installations
World War II sites of the United States
United States Navy lists